Styggevatnet is a glacial lake from the glacier Jostedalsbreen in Luster Municipality in Vestland county, Norway. The lake lies just southeast of the lake Austdalsvatnet. The lake is regulated by a dam and it empties into the river Jostedøla.

In the lake, it is possible to kayak with a guide between the ice rocks to a nearby glacier.

Media gallery

References

Lakes of Vestland
Luster, Norway
Reservoirs in Norway